PK-108 Tank is a constituency for the Khyber Pakhtunkhwa Assembly of the Khyber Pakhtunkhwa province of Pakistan.

See also 

 PK-107 Lakki Marwat-III
 PK-109 Lower South Waziristan

References

External links 
 Khyber Pakhtunkhwa Assembly's official website
 Election Commission of Pakistan's official website
 Awaztoday.com Search Result
 Election Commission Pakistan Search Result

Khyber Pakhtunkhwa Assembly constituencies